Kadınhanı is a town and district of Konya Province in the Central Anatolia region of Turkey. The name of the town ("Khan of the woman") refers to a certain female commissioner of an inn in the town. According to 2000 census, population of the district is 41,844 of which 14,816 live in the town of Kadınhanı.

Notes

References

External links
 District governor's official website 
 District municipality's official website 

Populated places in Konya Province
Districts of Konya Province
Lycaonia